Muhammad Abdullah (1 April 1932 – 21 October 2008) was a Bangladeshi academic. He was a professor of Dhaka University and researcher.

Early life and education
Abdullah was born on 1 April 1932 in Bangakhan, Lakshmipur. He passed Alim and Fazil from Noakhali Karamatia Madrasa in 1943 and 1945 respectively. He was conferred "Mumtazul Muhaddisin" title from Kolkata Alia Madrasa in 1947. He passed HSC from Hazi Mohammad Mohsin College in 1949. He graduated from Dhaka University in Urdu in 1952. He received his post graduate degree from this institution in 1953 in Urdu. He also received his post graduate degree in Islamic Studies and Arabic from Dhaka University in 1972 and 1973 respectively. He was conferred MPhil in 1981. He was also conferred PhD in 1983 in Arabic from Dhaka University.

Career
Abdullah joined Sylhet Government Alia Madrasah in 1952. He joined Dhaka University in 1972 as assistant professor of Urdu and Arabic departments. He became associate professor in 1978 and professor in 1985. He retired from his job in 1992. After retirement he worked as a supernumerary professor for ten years.

Abdullah was fluent in Arabic, Persian, Bangla, Urdu and English. He wrote 33 books. His articles were published in Bangladesh Encyclopedia, Islamic Encyclopedia and journals of home and abroad. He also conducted eleven research projects of University Grant Commission.

Awards and recognition
The editorial board of a magazine of Lahore titled Saiyara conferred him "Nishan-e-Urdu" in 1966 for his contribution in Urdu language and literature. He was also awarded Ibrahim Khan Gold Medal in 1992 from Dhaka University.

Death
Abdullah died on 21 October 2008 at the age of 76 in Shaheed Suhrawardy Hospital, Dhaka.

References

People from Lakshmipur District
1932 births
2008 deaths
Academic staff of the University of Dhaka
Bangladeshi male writers
University of Dhaka alumni
Academic staff of Sylhet Government Alia Madrasah